Elections to Sheffield City Council were held on 3 May 1996. One third of the council was up for election.

Election result

|- style="background-color:#F9F9F9"
! style="background-color: " |
| Militant Labour
| align="right" | 0
| align="right" | 0
| align="right" | 0
| align="right" | 0
| align="right" | 0.0
| align="right" | 0.5
| align="right" | 648
| align="right" | -0.1
|-

This result had the following consequences for the total number of seats on the Council after the elections:

Ward results

|- style="background-color:#F9F9F9"
! style="background-color: " |
| Militant Labour
| Peter Fryer
| align="right" | 172
| align="right" | 8.2
| align="right" | +8.2
|-

|- style="background-color:#F9F9F9"
! style="background-color: " |
| Militant Labour
| Alistair Tice
| align="right" | 163
| align="right" | 8.6
| align="right" | +0.4
|-

|- style="background-color:#F9F9F9"
! style="background-color: " |
| Militant Labour
| Ken Douglas
| align="right" | 313
| align="right" | 14.9
| align="right" | -6.6
|-

References

1996 English local elections
1996
1990s in Sheffield